Supreme Judicial Court may refer to:
Maine Supreme Judicial Court
Massachusetts Supreme Judicial Court
Rhode Island Supreme Court, formerly the Supreme Judicial Court

See also
Supreme Court of the United States
State supreme courts